Dudleytown may refer to:

Dudleytown, Connecticut, a ghost town nestled in the Appalachian Mountains of Litchfield County, Connecticut in the Town of Cornwall, United States
Dudleytown, Indiana, an unincorporated place in Jackson County, United States
Dudleytown Historic District, Guilford, Connecticut, United States
Dudley Town F.C., a football club in the West Midlands, England